Saint Damnat (also known as Davnet or Dymphna) was a nun who seems to have lived and died at Tydavnet (from Tech nDamnat, meaning "House of Damnat") at Sliabh Beagh, County Monaghan, Ireland. Tradition speaks of Saint Damnat as a virgin and the founder of a church or monastery. A bachall (staff) said to have belonged to her has been preserved; in the past it was used as a lie detector. It is now in the National Museum of Ireland in Dublin.

She is sometimes confused with Dymphna, the saint of Geel in Flanders, since John Colgan identified them as the same person in the mid seventeenth century. Both George Petrie and John O’Donovan of the antiquities division of the Ordnance Survey c.1830/40s doubted the link between the two names.

References

Late Ancient Christian female saints
5th-century Irish nuns
6th-century Christian saints
6th-century Irish people
Female saints of medieval Ireland
Medieval saints of Ulster
People from County Monaghan
Religion in County Monaghan
5th-century Christian saints
Christian female saints of the Middle Ages
6th-century Irish nuns
Medieval Irish saints